Crazy Joe may refer to:

the nickname of mobster Joe Gallo
Crazy Joe (film), a 1974 film about Joe Gallo, starring Peter Boyle
"Crazy" Joe Davola, a fictional character from the TV series Seinfeld
 Josip Šimunić, sometimes referred to in Croatian as "Ludi Joe" (Crazy Joe)